Corazón salvaje ("Wild at Heart") was the second film adaptation of the Caridad Bravo Adams 1957 novel of the same name. It is considered the closest to the original story.

The first film was made in 1956 and starred Martha Roth. The 1968 version starred Julio Alemán in the role of Juan del Diablo and Angélica María as Mónica Molnar – this part made her a star in China. She later repeated her role in the 1977 telenovela version.

Cast
 Julio Alemán as Juan del Diablo
 Angélica María as Mónica Molnar
 Teresa Velázquez as Aimée Molnar
 Manuel Gil
 Beatriz Baz
 Miguel Macía
 José Baviera
 Sara Guasch
 Sandra Chávez
 Rafael Llamas
 Antonio Bravo
 Consuelo Frank
 Carlos Agostí
 Eduardo MacGregor
 Víctor Alcocer
 Antonio Raxel
 Ramiro Orci
 Manuel Garay
 Juan Antonio Edwards
 Roberto Haughton

Plot
For the story read the article on the novel Corazón salvaje.

See also
 Corazón salvaje

References

External links 
 

1968 films
1960s Spanish-language films
Films based on Mexican novels
Films set in the 1900s
Estudios Churubusco films
Films directed by Tito Davison
1968 drama films
Mexican drama films
1960s Mexican films